The northern blue devil, Paraplesiops poweri, is a species of fish in the longfin family Plesiopidae.  It has been recorded from the inshore waters of Queensland, eastern Australia, from Bowen to Moreton Bay. The specific name honours Percy Power, who caught the type specimen.

References

northern blue devil
Marine fish of Northern Australia
Fauna of Queensland
northern blue devil